Mary Elizabeth Mills (born 1964) is an American opera singer.

Biography
Mills was born in Shreveport, Louisiana, but moved to Dallas, Texas as a young child. In Dallas, she attended Hyer Elementary School, Arch H. McCulloch Middle School and Highland Park High School, graduating in 1982. In high school, she played the violin in the orchestra, sang in the Lads and Lassies Choir and as a senior was the female lead in the musical The Boyfriend.She started private voice lessons with Barbara Moore at SMU when she was 16 years old.  She also sang in youth choirs at Highland Park Presbyterian Church, whose High school Choir, with her as a soloist, made an album to raise money and toured Asia.

In The Dallas Morning News when returning to Dallas to perform, Mills claimed she didn't know that she had any real singing talent until late in her high school years. She graduated from the University of Cincinnati – College-Conservatory of Music in 1986 and received a Masters of Music at Yale in 1988, where she studied with Doris Yarick-Cross, continued her studies with her throughout her career. Among her numerous competitions and awards, she has won the Metropolitan Opera National Council Auditions, the George London Award, Maria Callas Debut Artist of the Year Award at Dallas Opera, Washington Opera Singer of the Year, Florida Grand Opera Singer of the Year, and the Diva Award from Opera Company of Philadelphia. She has collaborated with some of the conductors including Yves Abel, Antonio Allemandi, Marco Armiliato, Gary Bertini,Harry Bicket, James Conlin, John DeMain, Sian Edwards, Mark Elder, Christoph Eschenbach, John Fiore, Jane Glover, Ivan Fischer, Neemi Järvi, Armin Jordan,Jan Latham Koenig, Jiri Kout,  Emmanuel Krivine, Jacques Lacombe, Fabio Luisi, Steven Mercurio, Marc Minkowski, Kirill Petrenko, Markus Poschner, Carlo Rizzi, Julius Rudel, Donald Runnicles and Ulf Schirmer.

Career
Career highlights include her many engagements with the Metropolitan Opera, notably her acclaimed debut as Zdenka in Strauss’s Arabella, Micaela in Bizet’s Carmen and Mimì in Franco Zeffirelli’s staging of Puccini’s La Bohème as well as in Central Park for the Met in the Parks Series. Mills has repeated Mimì in Berlin, Detroit, Santiago de Chile, Antwerp (Belgium), Strasbourg, Geneva and San Francisco. At the San Francisco Opera she made her debut while an Adler Fellow as the 15-year-old Girl in Lulu, and created the role of Cecile de Volanges for their production of the world premiere of Dangerous Liaisons, which was taped for broadcast on PBS and for commercial release. At San Francisco Opera, she has sung over eighteen productions, including La Bohème, Die Zauberflöte, Carmen and Arabella, among others.

The American soprano made her professional debut as Barbarina in Le Nozze di Figaro at the Houston Grand Opera as a member of the Houston Opera Studio in 1988, a position she left after being invited by Lotfi Mansouri to join the Adler Fellowship Program of the San Francisco Opera.  She has also been a frequent guest to Dallas Opera, Washington Opera, Seattle Opera, Florida Grand Opera, Michigan Opera Theater, Opera Pacific, Opera Company of Philadelphia, Opera St. Louis and many others in a wide variety of roles which have included Micaela,Musetta, Manon, Marguerite, Pamina, Mozart's Susanna, Arminda in La Finta Giardiniera,Ilia, and the title roles in Janáček's The Cunning Little Vixen, Carlisle Floyd's Susannah and Monteverdi's L'Incoronazione di Poppea.  She has also sung such roles as the title roles in Rusalka and The Merry Widow, Gilda in Rigoletto and Tatiana in Eugene Onegin .

Mills made her European debut as Charpentier's Louise in Geneva in 1992, a success that immediately resulted in invitations to the Wexford Festival in Ireland (Camille in Herold's Zampa) and the Bregenz Festival (Olga in Giordano's Fedora). The artist made her debut at the Paris Bastille in 1997 in the title role of Massenet's Manon, and was re-engaged in the same theatre to sing Micaela in Carmen as well as Marguerite in Faust and at the Palais Garnier as the Infantin in Zemlimsky's Der Zwerg. She has also been heard in Antwerp in Gounod's Roméo et Juliette, and Antonia in Les Contes d'Hoffmann in Santiago, Chile as well as Marguerite in a new production of Gounod’s Faust at the Opéra de Lyon. She was also heard in the role of Rösschen in Spohr's," Faust," at the Theater an der Wien, formerly known as the Klangbogen Festspiele. In the course of the 2002/2003 season, she made her debut at the Berlin Staatsoper as Mimì, made her debut at the Arena de Verona as Micaela and sang Ilia in the controversial Opéra de Paris (Garnier) production of Idomeneo.  She also appeared in Monte Carlo and Bilbao in the title role of Manon.

Mills sang her first Katya Kabanova at Theatre Saint Gallen, Switzerland to great acclaim in 2004 and could also be heard that same year at the Theater an der Wien  as Jitka in Smetana’s Dalibor. In 2006, she returned as Mimì at the Berlin Staatsoper and debuted the role of Nedda in I Pagliacci at Pittsburgh Opera. Continuing her penchant for new and challenging music, Mills sang the role of Sarah in the West Coast premiere of Jake Heggie's The End of the Affair at Seattle Opera and sang Stella in André Previn's A Streetcar Named Desire at the Theater an der Wien.  Mills originated the title role of Joan of Arc in Walter Braunfels' new opera Szenen aus dem Leben der Heiligen Johanna in a Christoph Schlingensief production at the Deutsche Oper in Berlin in 2008, which repeated in 2010. and 2012. Mills travelled to Seville in 2009, where she sang the Dutchess of Parma in Busoni's ," Dr. Faust." She made her role debut of Elsa in Lohengrin for the Staatsoper Stuttgart in 2010, and returned in 2011 for the title role of Katja Kabanova. In April 2014 she sang Elsa in Lohengrin again, this time in an Antony McDonald production in Warsaw. In 2013, the commercial recording of Lehar's rare operetta," Das Fürstenkind, was released, where Mills sang the role of Mary Ann.

International Herald Tribune reported she gave a "vibrant, emotionally fraught performance in the taxing role of Joan."

Mills lives in Berlin and is divorced from German actor, with whom she shares two children. She teaches voice privately in Berlin .

References

Sources 
 
 (Includes a photo)

External links
 

1964 births
Living people
University of Cincinnati – College-Conservatory of Music alumni
Yale School of Music alumni
American operatic sopranos
Musicians from Dallas
Musicians from Shreveport, Louisiana
American expatriates in Germany
Singers from Louisiana
Classical musicians from Texas
Singers from Texas